The Tour La Villette (previously known as the Tour Daewoo,  Tour Périphérique and Tour Olympe) is an office skyscraper located in Aubervilliers, in the inner suburbs of Paris, France.

Built in 1974, and renovated in the 1990s, it reaches a height of 125 metres (410ft). It is located at the Porte de la Villette, near the Boulevard Périphérique separating Paris from its suburbs. It hosted the European headquarters of the Korean enterprise Daewoo.

See also 
 Skyscraper
 List of tallest structures in Paris

External links 
 Tour Daewoo (Emporis)

Villette
Villette
Buildings and structures completed in 1974